José María Franco Ramallo (born 28 September 1978, in Montevideo) is a Uruguayan footballer who played as a striker for Juventud de Las Piedras.

Honours

Peñarol

Uruguayan League: 1999

References

External links

1978 births
Living people
Uruguayan footballers
Uruguay international footballers
Uruguayan expatriate footballers
Uruguayan Primera División players
Central Español players
Peñarol players
Torino F.C. players
Serie A players
Serie B players
Santiago Wanderers footballers
Club Atlético River Plate (Montevideo) players
C.S. Emelec footballers
Centro Atlético Fénix players
Juventud de Las Piedras players
Expatriate footballers in Chile
Expatriate footballers in Italy
Expatriate footballers in Ecuador
Association football forwards
Footballers from Montevideo